Jan Antonín Vocásek (February 26, 1706 - June 26, 1757) was a Czech Baroque painter.

Vocásek was born in Rychnov nad Kněžnou. He painted still life with fish, birds, flowers and fruit with realistically detailed precision, as well as portraits of horses. Some paintings were signed on behalf of his mother Hroschetzky. His paintings are located in the castle of Rychnov and the National Gallery in Prague.

References
 P. Toman, Dictionary of Czechoslovak artists. Prague: B. Koci to 1926.

Czech baroque painters
1706 births
1757 deaths
People from Rychnov nad Kněžnou